Sir Arthur Purves Phayre  (7 May 1812 – 14 December 1885) was a career British Indian Army officer who was the first Commissioner of British Burma, 1862–1867, Governor of Mauritius, 1874–1878, and author.

His brother, Sir Robert Phayre (1820–1897), also served in India. They were part of the Phayre family, of which Lt Col Robert Phayre, who served the British administration in Ireland in the 17th century, also had the death warrant of Charles I addressed to him and two other Colonels.

Descendants: Colonel Robert Bernard Phayre MC  2/4th Prince of Wales Own Gurkha Rifles, son Colonel Robert Desmond Hensley Phayre Royal Artillery, son Lt Col Robert (Robin) Dermot Spinks Phayre LI, cousin Col Terence Peter Phayre Knott MC RM, of whom son Captain Robert Knott AAC changed name by deed poll to Phayre, to prevent family name dying out, lives in Kenya.

Early life
Phayre was born in Shrewsbury and educated at Shrewsbury School. He joined the Indian Army in 1828. In 1846 he was appointed assistant to the commissioner of the province of Tenasserim, Burma, and in 1849 he was made commissioner of Arakan. After the Second Anglo-Burmese War (1852), he became commissioner of Pegu. He was made a Brevet Captain in 1854 and in 1862 he was promoted to Lieutenant-Colonel.

Work

Government office
In 1862 Phayre was made commissioner for the entire province of British Burma. He left Burma in 1867.

He served as 12th Governor of Mauritius from 21 Sep 1874 to 31 Dec 1878.

He was appointed a CB in 1864, promoted to Colonel in 1866 and was knighted with the KCSI in 1867. In 1871, he was promoted to Major-General and was promoted to Lieutenant-General in 1873. He retired to Bray in Ireland and was appointed a GCMG in 1878.

Naturalist
Phayre wrote the first standard History of Burma (1883). He is commemorated in the names of a number of animals, including:
Phayre's leaf monkey, Trachypithecus phayrei
Indochinese flying squirrel, Hylopetes phayrei
Phayre's squirrel, Callosciurus phayrei
Eared pitta, Pitta phayrei
Brown Asian forest tortoise, Manouria emys phayrei 
Ashy-headed green pigeon, Treron phayrei

Numismatist
Phayre collected coins (some are now in the British Museum collection), and in 1882 wrote Coins of Arakan, of Pegu, and of Burma, International Numismata Orientalia, part 8. The title page notes that he was a corresponding member of the Société Académique Indo-Chinoise. He was also a member of the Royal Asiatic Society.

Arms

References

External links
 http://www.worldstatesmen.org/Myanmar.htm

1812 births
1885 deaths
Knights Grand Cross of the Order of St Michael and St George
Knights Commander of the Order of the Star of India
Companions of the Order of the Bath
Governors of British Mauritius
Administrators in British Burma
People educated at Shrewsbury School
Military personnel from Shrewsbury
British Indian Army generals
British East India Company Army officers
Indian Army cavalry generals of World War I
English naturalists
19th-century naturalists
British numismatists
Scientists from Shrewsbury